St. Luke's Episcopal Church or Old St. Luke's Episcopal Church may refer to:

United States 
(by state then city)
 St. Luke's Episcopal Church (Cahaba, Alabama), formerly located in Browns, Alabama, listed on the National Register of Historic Places (NRHP) in Dallas County, Alabama
 St. Luke's Episcopal Church (Hot Springs, Arkansas), listed on the NRHP in Garland County, Arkansas
 St. Luke's Episcopal Church (Palm Beach, California), listed on the Long Beach historic landmarks
 St. Luke's Episcopal Church (Denver, Colorado), a Denver Landmark
 St. Luke's Episcopal Church (New Haven, Connecticut), listed on the NRHP in New Haven County, Connecticut
 St. Luke's Episcopal Church and Cemetery (Courtenay, Florida), listed on the NRHP in Brevard County, Florida
St. Luke's Episcopal Church (Atlanta)
 St. Luke's Episcopal Church (Weiser, Idaho), listed on the NRHP in Washington County, Idaho
 St. Luke's Episcopal Church (Cannelton, Indiana), listed on the NRHP in Perry County, Indiana
 St. Luke's Episcopal Church (Fort Madison, Iowa), NRHP-listed
 St. Luke's Episcopal Church (Anchorage, Kentucky), listed on the NRHP in Jefferson County, Kentucky
 St. Luke's Episcopal Church (Lanesborough, Massachusetts), listed on the NRHP in Berkshire County, Massachusetts
 St. Luke's Episcopal Church (Hastings, Minnesota)
 St. Luke's Episcopal Church (Hope, New Jersey), listed on the NRHP in Warren County, New Jersey
 St. Luke's Episcopal Church (Beacon, New York), listed on the NRHP in Dutchess County, New York
 St. Luke's Episcopal Church (Brockport, New York), listed on the NRHP in Monroe County, New York
 St. Luke's Episcopal Church (Queens), listed on the NRHP in Queens County, New York
 St. Luke's Episcopal Church (Jerusalem, New York), listed on the NRHP in Yates County, New York
 St. Luke's Episcopal Church (Katonah, New York), listed on the NRHP in Westchester County, New York
 St. Luke's Episcopal Church (Asheville, North Carolina), listed on the NRHP in Buncombe County, North Carolina
 St. Luke's Episcopal Church (Eden, North Carolina), listed on the NRHP in Rockingham County, North Carolina
 St. Luke's Episcopal Church (Cincinnati, Ohio)
 Old St. Luke's Episcopal Church (Cincinnati, Ohio)
 St. Luke's Episcopal Church (Granville, Ohio), listed on the NRHP in Licking County, Ohio
 St. Luke's Episcopal Church (Lebanon, Pennsylvania)
 St. Luke's Episcopal Church (Cleveland, Tennessee), listed on the NRHP in Bradley County, Tennessee
 St. Luke's Episcopal Church (Jackson, Tennessee)
 Old St. Luke's Episcopal Church (Belton, Texas), listed on the NRHP in Bell County, Texas
 St. Luke's Episcopal Church (Park City, Utah), listed on the NRHP in Summit County, Utah
 St. Luke's Episcopal Church (Fine Creek Mills, Virginia), listed on the NRHP in Powhatan County, Virginia
 St. Luke's Episcopal Church (Washington, D.C.), listed on the NRHP in Washington, D.C.
 St. Luke's Episcopal Church (Vancouver, Washington)
 St. Luke's Episcopal Church, Chapel, Guildhall, and Rectory, Racine, WI, listed on the NRHP in Racine County, Wisconsin
 St. Luke's Episcopal Church (Buffalo, Wyoming), listed on the NRHP in Johnson County, Wyoming

See also
 St. Luke's Evangelical Lutheran Church, listed on the NRHP in Manhattan, New York
 St. Luke's United Methodist Church (Dubuque, Iowa), listed on the NRHP in Dubuque County, Iowa
 St. Luke's Protestant Episcopal Church (Seaford, Delaware), listed on the NRHP in Sussex County, Delaware
 St. Luke's Protestant Episcopal Church (Brooklyn, New York), listed on the NRHP in Kings County, New York
 St. Luke's Church (disambiguation)